Knock on Wood is a studio album by Amii Stewart released in February 1979. The album yielded two successful single releases, "Knock on Wood" (#1 US Pop, #6 US R&B, #5 US Club Play, #6 UK, #13 Germany) and "Light My Fire / 137 Disco Heaven" (#69 US Pop, #36 US R&B, #5 UK, #26 Germany). A double A-side single with remixed versions of "Knock on Wood" and "Light My Fire" reached #7 on the UK charts in 1985 followed by a re-issue of "You Really Touched My Heart" (UK #89).

The original Knock on Wood album in its entirety remains officially unreleased on compact disc, a semi-official release was issued in Russia in 1999 on AS4000. This release paired this album with the follow-up release Paradise Bird and one bonus track "My Guy, My Girl", and includes all original artwork.

The album was released as simply Amii Stewart in the UK.

Track listing
All songs written by Barry Leng and Simon May, except where noted

Side A
"Knock on Wood" (Eddie Floyd, Steve Cropper) – 6:11
"You Really Touched My Heart" – 4:29
"Light My Fire" / "137 Disco Heaven" (The Doors) / (Leng, May) – 8:26

Side B
"Bring It on Back to Me" – 3:56
"Closest Thing to Heaven" – 3:44
"Am I Losing You" (Barry Leng, Gerry Morris) – 3:20
"Get Your Love Back" (Kenneth Gamble, Leon Huff) – 3:56
"Only a Child in Your Eyes" – 3:07

Personnel
 Amii Stewart – vocals
 Jimmy Chambers – backing vocals
 Sheen – backing vocals
 Tony Jackson – backing vocals
 Gerry Morris – bass guitar, backing vocals
 Adrian Sheppard, Peter Boita – drums
 Alan Murphy – guitar
 Barry Leng – guitar, backing vocals
 Ian Hughes – keyboards
 Pete Arnesen – keyboards
 Simon May – keyboards
 Glyn Thomas – percussion
 Ken Freeman – synthesizer

Production
 Producer – Barry Leng
 Brass arrangement – Ken Freeman
 Strings arrangement – Ian Hughes
 Engineering (Marquee Studio) – John Eden, Phil Harding, Steve Holroyd
 Engineering (Red Bus Studio) – Geoff Calver, Tony Swain
 Engineering (T. W. Studio) – Alan Winstanley
 Engineering (Utopia Studio) – Greg Walsh, John Mackswith
 Mastering – Ian Cooper
 Recorded at T. W. Studio, Utopia Studio, Marquee Studio and Red Bus Studio

Charts

References

1979 debut albums
Amii Stewart albums
Ariola Records albums
Atlantic Records albums
Hansa Records albums